Garabogaz is a city subordinate to Turkmenbashy District, Balkan province, Turkmenistan, on the shore of the Caspian Sea.   Until 2002, the municipality had the status of a town and was named Bekdaş .

Etymology
The city takes its name from the nearby Garabogaz gulf. Atanyyazow explains that the name originally applied to the narrow strait which connects the gulf to the Caspian Sea. Because water in the strait, termed a "throat", was darker than the water on either side, it was termed "dark" or "black", hence garabogaz. Over time the name was applied to the gulf itself and ultimately to the city. The original name, Bekdash is taken from the name of a small hill nearby, on which a television antenna has been installed. The origin of bek is obscure; daş means "stone, rock" and Atanyyazov suggests it refers to the pebbles found in the area.

Overview
The settlement occupies the northern tapering of a ridge before it becomes a narrow spit. These together divide the Garabogazköl lagoon from the Caspian Sea, with a small inlet channel to the south of the town. It has abundant and varied mineral resources from the highly saline lagoon. It is one of few places in the world where naturally deposited sodium sulfate exists in commercially exploitable quantities.

Economy
Garabogaz is the site of one of Turkmenistan's three urea (carbamide) plants.  The $1.3 billion Garabogaz plant, built by Mitsubishi Heavy Industries and GAP İnşaat (a subsidiary of Çalık Holding), was inaugurated on September 18, 2018, with a design capacity of 1.16 million tonnes of urea per year. Between January and October 2019, the Garabogaz plant produced approximately 392,000 tonnes of urea, of which 261,000 tonnes was exported. The plant operates a loading terminal for shipping urea via the Caspian.

A mineral salt extraction plant dating to the Soviet period is located 15 km northeast of the city. It was constructed over a period of ten years, between 1963 and 1973. It produces sodium sulfate as well as epsomite and Glauber's salt. It has a reported capacity to produce 400,000 tonnes of sodium sulfate per year, but in 1998 produced an estimated 55,000 tonnes, and in 2018, 26,000 tonnes.

Transport
The city lies on the P-18 highway connecting the city of Turkmenbashy with the border of Kazakhstan at Temir Baba. This road is planned for an upgrade or replacement according to press reports, since the section of highway between Garabogaz and the border is mostly unpaved. Garabogaz is served by a freight rail line. Plans were announced in 2018 to renovate the small municipal airport, which does not offer regular passenger service.

Garabogaz offers the only gasoline station between Turkmenbashy and the border with Kazakhstan.

Exile village 
It serves as a spot of supervised exile in Turkmen law. Gulgeldy Annaniyazov is one person held there, since 2019.

History
Prior to 1932 the town lay in what is now Kazakhstan.

References

Populated places in Balkan Region